Off Centre  is the sixth studio album by Irish singer-songwriter Gilbert O'Sullivan, produced by Gus Dudgeon and originally released in October 1980. Union Square Music re-released it August 2012 on Salvo label in part of the Gilbert O'Sullivan - A Singer & His Songs collection.

The lead single from the album, "What's In a Kiss", was O'Sullivan's first top 20 hit in the UK in over five years, peaking at number 19. The song proved to be his final top 20 single in the UK.

Track listing 
All songs written by Gilbert O'Sullivan.
 "I Love It But" - 3:33
 "What's In a Kiss" - 2:36
 "Hello It's Goodbye" - 3:08
 "Why Pretend" - 3:58
 "I'm Not Getting Any Younger" - 4:32
 "Things That Go Bump in the Night" - 4:51
 "Help Is On the Way" - 3:43
 "For What It's Worth" - 4:05
 "The Niceness of It All" - 5:26
 "Can't Get Enough of You" - 3:27
 "Break It To Me Gently" - 3:20
 "Or So They Say" - 3:50

Bonus track on the 2012 remaster
 "Down, Down, Down" (b-side of "What's In a Kiss", August 1980) - 2:38

Charts

Personnel
 Gilbert O'Sullivan - vocals, piano

Additional personnel
 Phil Curtis - bass
 Chris Laurence - bass on "I'm Not Getting Any Younger"
 Paul Westwood - bass on "Can't Get Enough Of You"
 Steve Holley - drums
 Dave Mattacks - drums on "Can't Get Enough Of You"
 Terry Cox - drums on "What's In a Kiss"
 Martin Jenner - acoustic and lead guitars; steel guitar on "For What It's Worth"
 Tim Renwick - acoustic and lead guitars
 Ray Russell - acoustic guitar on "Can't Get Enough Of You"
 Pete Wingfield - electric piano on "The Niceness Of It All", second piano on "Why Pretend", organ on "Hello It's Goodbye" and synthesizer on "Or So They Say"
 Howie Casey - saxophone on "I'm Not Getting Any Younger" and "Why Pretend"
 Jeff Daley - saxophone on "Help Is On the Way"
 Chris Rea - accordion on "I Love It But"
 Stuart Epps - harmony and backing vocals
 Alan Carvell - harmony and backing vocals on "I'm Not Getting Any Younger"
 English Chorale - choir on "Or So They Say"

References

Sources
 Off Centre, CD booklet, 2012

External links 
Official Gilbert O'Sullivan page

1980 albums
Gilbert O'Sullivan albums
Albums produced by Gus Dudgeon
CBS Records albums